Shan Danna (born 8 October 1991 in Zhejiang) is a retired Chinese volleyball player. She represented her nation at the London 2012 Olympics. 
She won the 2013 FIVB Women's U23 Volleyball World Championship.

Clubs
  Zhejiang New Century Tourism (2009 - 2017)

References

1991 births
Living people
Chinese women's volleyball players
Sportspeople from Ningbo
Olympic volleyball players of China
Volleyball players at the 2012 Summer Olympics
Volleyball players from Zhejiang
Liberos
21st-century Chinese women